Vangunu is an Oceanic language spoken by about 900 people on Vangunu Island, Solomon Islands.  Speakers of Vangunu also use the closely related Marovo.

References

Languages of the Solomon Islands
Northwest Solomonic languages